Ziadabad or Zeyadabad may refer to:
 Ziadabad, Arsanjan, Fars Province
 Ziadabad, Fasa, Fars Province
 Ziadabad, Sepidan, Fars Province
 Ziadabad, Isfahan
 Ziadabad, Kerman
 Ziadabad, Markazi